Kleiner Ravensberg is the highest elevation in the municipal area of Potsdam in Brandenburg, Germany with a peak at 114.2 m above sea level. It is located in a woodland called Ravensberge. The hill is part of a push moraine which was formed during the Weichselian glaciation.

Hills of Brandenburg